The 2020 Hollywood Casino 400 is a NASCAR Cup Series race that was held on October 18, 2020 at Kansas Speedway in Kansas City, Kansas. Contested over 267 laps on the  intermediate speedway, it was be the 33rd race of the 2020 NASCAR Cup Series season, the seventh race of the Playoffs, and first race of the Round of 8.

Report

Background

Kansas Speedway is a  tri-oval race track in Kansas City, Kansas. It was built in 2001 and it currently hosts two annual NASCAR race weekends. The Verizon IndyCar Series also raced at here until 2011. The speedway is owned and operated by the International Speedway Corporation.

Entry list
 (R) denotes rookie driver.
 (i) denotes driver who are ineligible for series driver points.

Qualifying
Chase Elliott was awarded the pole for the race as determined by competition-based formula.

Starting Lineup

Race

Stage Results

Stage One
Laps: 80

Stage Two
Laps: 80

Final Stage results

Stage Three
Laps: 107

The closing laps were met with disdain from some in the journalism and fan ranks, who suggested that the NA18D aerodynamics package used for the race prevented the best driver from winning the race.

Race statistics
 Lead changes: 17 among 11 different drivers
 Cautions/Laps: 6 for 31
 Red flags: 0
 Time of race: 2 hours, 53 minutes and 43 seconds
 Average speed:

Media

Television
NBC Sports covered the race on the television side. Rick Allen, Jeff Burton, Steve Letarte and Dale Earnhardt Jr. called the action from the booth, the first time since the March Phoenix round that commentators have been on site other than Charlotte. Dave Burns, Parker Kligerman and Marty Snider handled the pit road duties, Rutledge Wood and Super Bowl XLVII champion Bernard Pollard handled the features from their homes during the race.

Radio
MRN had the radio call for the race, which was simulcast on Sirius XM NASCAR Radio. Alex Hayden and Jeff Striegle called the race for MRN when the field raced thru the front straightaway. Dave Moody called the race for MRN from Turns 1 & 2, and Mike Bagley called the race for MRN from turns 3 & 4. Winston Kelley and Steve Post covered the action for MRN from pit lane.

Standings after the race

Drivers' Championship standings

Manufacturers' Championship standings

Note: Only the first 16 positions are included for the driver standings.

References

2020 in sports in Kansas
Hollywood Casino 400
NASCAR races at Kansas Speedway
Hollywood Casino 400